Sahodari Foundation is an Indian organisation providing counselling and support services for underprivileged transgender women. The organisation was founded by transgender activist and artist Kalki Subramaniam in July 2008 to provide opportunities for education, counseling services, education scholarships and supporting livelihood through creative skills training and development. The organisation is based in Tamil Nadu state in India. The organisation uses art, literature, films and theatre to advocate for social, economic, and political justice for transgender people and gender-nonconforming people.

Origin
During her postgraduate studies, Kalki started publishing a monthly magazine in Tamil for transgender women called Sahodari. At that time prejudice against the transgender people was high because media projected only stereotyped images of transgender people. She wanted to break it and bring forth the real issues and problems of the transgender community. In her magazine, she wrote on health, wellness, spirituality, employment and education.

Mission
The Foundation's main objective is to promote social, political, and economic equity and campaign for civil and legal rights of transgender people.

Awards
In 2010, Sahodari Foundation received the Kokilavani Memorial Award for its contribution towards transgender rights and activism. The foundation trained transgender people as community video journalists and encouraged them to speak up their stories on visual media through a project called Project Kalki. Many transgender women brought out their voices through video films and the organisation showcased those films in YouTube, blogs and other websites and also screened the films across the country. For this innovative effort, the organisation received an international award for innovation in activism using technology and internet.

References

External links 

 

2008 establishments in Tamil Nadu
Foundations based in India
Organisations based in Tamil Nadu
Organizations established in 2008
LGBT organisations in India
Transgender organizations
 Social welfare charities